Johann Christian von Hellbach 15 July 1757 – 18 October 1828) was a German lawyer and writer. He wrote extensively but not exclusively on history.

Life
Johann Christian Hellbach was born in Arnstadt, a small but locally important town in central Germany, which earlier in the century had been the home town of Johann Sebastian Bach.  Hellbach's father was Ludwig Gottfried Hellbach. At the local school Hellbach's teacher was the historian Johann Gottlieb Lindner.   (In 1812 Hellbach would edit and publish Lindner's autobiography.) On leaving school, between 1777 and 1780 Hellbach studied Jurisprudence, after which he lived in Arnstadt.

From 1788 he lived on his estate at Berga, roughly 100 km (60 miles) to the north.   During this period he was also employed closer to Arnstadt, at Wechmar, working as Commission Secretary for the Duchy of Saxe-Meiningen.   In the end he returned to living full-time in Arnstadt, promoted to the post of Advocate and Legal Counsel for the Principality of Saxe-Meiningen.

Personal
Hellbach married Charlotte Friedericka Wilhelmina Ernestina von Berga at his Berga estate on 17 May 1789.

Ennoblement
On 3 December 1819  confirmed and renewed the ancient nobility of Hellbach's family within Schwarzburg-Sondershausen. In terms of the sources, it was at this point that the name "Hellbach" became "von Hellbach".

References

 Published output (not a complete list)
Hellbach wrote various legal books and others covering the history of Thuringia and, in particular, of Schwarzburg-Sondershausen.
 Handbuch des Rangrechts, Ansbach 1804, Digitalisat
 Archiv für die Geographie, Geschichte und Statistik der Grafschaft Gleichen und ihrer Besitzer, 2 Bände, Altenburg 1805, Band 1, Band 2
 Adels-Lexikon, 2 Bände, Ilmenau 1825/26 Band 1, Band 2
 Archiv von und für Schwarzburg, 1787, Digitalisat Nachtrag von 1789
 Historische Nachrichten von den thüringischen Bergschlössern Gleichen, Wachsenburg und Mühlberg, 1802, Digitalisat
 Grundriß der zuverlässigeren Genealogie des fürstlichen Hauses Schwarzburg, 1820
 Handbuch des Schwarzburg-sondershausener, besonders neueren Privatrechts, 1820
 Nachricht von der sehr alten Lieben Frauen-Kirche und von dem dabei gestandenen Jungfrauen–Kloster zu Arnstadt, 1821, Nachtrag von 1828
 Niklas Christoph Reichsfreiherr von Lynker: ein biographischer Versuch, Digitalisat

19th-century German historians
Jurists from Thuringia
German male non-fiction writers
1757 births
1828 deaths
People from Arnstadt